Satender Dagar (born 12 January 1981) is an Indian professional wrestler. He is best known for his tenures with WWE, where he competed in their developmental territory NXT under the ring name Jeet Rama.

Early life
Born in Baghru village of Sonipat District, Haryana, Satender was a ten-time kushti heavyweight amateur wrestling champion and three-time winner of the Hind Kesari award in India.

Professional wrestling career

WWE (2015–2021)
On 2 June 2015 it was reported that Satender, along with fellow Indian recruit Lovepreet Sangha, had been signed by WWE and would be reporting to the WWE Performance Center for training. He made his in-ring debut at a NXT live event in Fort Pierce, Florida on 29 September 2015, competing in a battle royal. He made his singles debut for the company under the ring name Jeet Rama at a WWE live event in New Delhi on 15 January 2016, defeating Chad Gable. Since then he has competed several times mostly during NXT live events. Jeet Rama and Kishan Raftar once again teamed up against The Miztourage (Curtis Axel and Bo Dallas) in which they came out victorious at New Delhi on 7 December 2017. On 10 February 2018, Jeet Rama teamed with Kassius Ohno to take on The Forgotten Sons (Steve Cutler and Wesley Blake) at an Orlando NXT live event, in which they were defeated. On 26 January 2021, Jeet Rama made his TV debut against AJ Styles at Superstar Spectacle in a losing effort, but was praised for his performance. On 15 October, he made his debut on 205 Live in a losing effort against Boa. On the 22 October episode of 205 Live, Rama faced Xyon Quinn in a losing effort. On the 29 October episode of 205 Live, Rama was again defeated by Boa. On the 2 November episode of NXT 2.0, Rama was defeated by Solo Sikoa in what would be his last match before he was released from his contract on 4 November 2021.

References

External links

Indian male professional wrestlers
People from Sonipat district
Living people
1981 births
21st-century professional wrestlers 
 Indian professional wrestlers